"Maybe That's What It Takes" is a song by English singer-songwriter Alex Parks, taken from her debut album, Introduction (2003). It was released as her debut single on 17 November 2003, shortly after she won the second series of Fame Academy, and peaked at number three on the UK Singles Chart and number 26 in Ireland.

Track listings
UK CD single
 "Maybe That's What It Takes"
 "Beautiful"
 "Overconscious"

UK cassette single
 "Maybe That's What It Takes"
 "Beautiful"

Credits and personnel
Credits are adapted from the UK CD single liner notes.

Studios
 Recorded at Atomic Studios, Livingston Studios, Britannia Row Studios, and Mayfair Studios (London, UK)
 Mixed at Metropolis Studios (London, UK)

Personnel

 Alex Parks – vocals, writing
 Helen Boulding – writing, backing vocals, piano
 Hussein Boon – guitar
 Julian Emery – guitar
 Seton Daunt – bass, electric guitar
 Steve Davis – bass
 Bobby Irwin – drums
 Glenn Skinner – keyboards, production, engineering, programming
 Ash Howes – additional keyboards, additional production, mixing
 The London Session Orchestra – orchestra
 Mark "Duck" Blackwell – co-production, additional programming
 Keith Uddin – additional engineering
 Alan Branch – vocal recording engineer
 Reece Gilmore – drum programming
 Gavyn Wright – concertmaster
 Simon B Hale – string arrangement
 Blue Source – art direction and design
 Alan Clarke – photography

Charts

Weekly charts

Year-end charts

References

External links
 UKMIX - MAYBE THAT'S WHAT IT TAKES single reviews

2003 debut singles
2003 songs
Alex Parks songs
Songs written by Alex Parks
Songs written by Helen Boulding
Polydor Records singles